The 2011 Judo Grand Slam Tokyo was held in Tokyo, Japan from 9 to 11 December 2011.

Medal summary

Men's events

Women's events

Source Results

Medal table

References

External links
 

2011 IJF World Tour
2011 Judo Grand Slam
Judo
Grand Slam, 2011
Judo
Judo